Nicolas "Ken" Kendi Bellini (born May 14, 2003) is a Brazilian-born-American soccer player who plays as a forward for Real Monarchs in the USL Championship via the Real Salt Lake academy.

Career 
Bellini spent time with the Real Salt Lake academy in Utah from 2015. He made his debut for the club's USL Championship side Real Monarchs as an academy player on September 26, 2020, coming on as an 87th-minute substitute during a 1–1 draw with Colorado Springs Switchbacks.

References

External links 
 USSDA bio
 
 Ken scored a hat trick (photo from July 15, 2015) at Real Salt Lake

2003 births
Living people
American soccer players
Association football forwards
Brazilian expatriate footballers
Brazilian expatriate sportspeople in the United States
Brazilian footballers
People from Lehi, Utah
Real Monarchs players
Soccer players from Utah
USL Championship players